Judge Motz may refer to:

Diana Gribbon Motz (born 1943), judge of the United States Court of Appeals for the Fourth Circuit
J. Frederick Motz (born 1942), judge of the United States District Court for the District of Maryland